"All Because Of You" is the 25th single from Japanese pop duo Puffy AmiYumi released on May 21, 2008. The title song is written and composed by Avril Lavigne and Butch Walker, and is performed entirely in English. The second song Frontier no Pioneer is a cover originally produced by Tamio Okuda and was used as a CM song for Kagome vegetable juice "Yasai Seikatsu 100!".

The limited edition has different cover art, and comes with a bonus DVD including footage of four songs recorded live at their December 19, 2007 tour finale at the Shibuya AX.

Track listings and formats
 CD Single
 "All Because of You"  – 2:25
 "フロンティアのパイオニア" ("Frontier Pioneer") – 3:40
 "Closet Full of Love" (Ryukyudisko Remix) – 4:13

Special Edition [CD + DVD]

CD
 All Because Of You
 Furontia no Paionia/フロンティアのパイオニア/Frontier Pioneer
 Closet Full Of Love (RYUKYUDISKO REMIX)

DVD
 Boom Boom Beat
 Tokyo I'm On My Way
 Kimi To Motorbike
 Wild Girls On Circuit

Credits and personnel
 Puffy – vocals, backing vocals
 Avril Lavigne – writer
 Butch Walker – writer, producer, guitar, bass, keyboards, percussion, backing vocals, programming
 Josh Freese – drums

Credits and personnel adapted from Bring It! album liner notes.

Chart performance
The single peaked at number 34 on the singles chart, selling 3.599 copies that week, and stayed on the chart for 3 weeks.

References

2008 singles
Puffy AmiYumi songs
Songs written by Avril Lavigne
Songs written by Butch Walker
Song recordings produced by Butch Walker
2008 songs
Ki/oon Music singles

pt:All Because of You (canção de Puffy)